Rapture of the Deep is the 18th studio album by English hard rock band Deep Purple, released in October 2005. It is the fourth studio album from Deep Purple since Steve Morse joined the band in 1994 and the second to feature veteran keyboardist Don Airey. The album was produced by Mike Bradford who also produced the band's previous release, Bananas.

Release and reception

Like Bananas, the album received generally positive reviews from critics and fans. Rapture of the Deep is Deep Purple's first release in Europe on the German label Edel Records, while in the US the record was released by Edel's sub-label Eagle Records.

The album peaked on Billboard's USA Top Independent Albums chart at position No. 43. In the USA, the album sold 2500 copies during the first week. In the UK, the album sold 3500 copies during the first week and 1200 copies during the week after. It also made the top 20 in several European charts. The title track "Rapture of the Deep" was released as a promo single in 2005.

The track "Money Talks" sees singer Ian Gillan perform the widest vocal range heard on any Deep Purple recording, with the bridge featuring a double-tracked deep bass vocal and the song's coda featuring a high-pitched scream.

Track listing

Standard edition 
All songs written by Ian Gillan, Roger Glover, Steve Morse, Don Airey and Ian Paice, except where noted

Personnel
Deep Purple
Ian Gillan – vocals
Steve Morse – guitar
Don Airey – keyboards
Roger Glover – bass
Ian Paice – drums

Production
Produced and engineered by Michael Bradford
Recorded at Chunky Style Studios, Los Angeles, CA, 2005
Mastered by Andy Van Dette at Masterdisk. New York

Charts

Accolades

References

2005 albums
Deep Purple albums
Edel AG albums
Albums produced by Michael Bradford